Mukhtar Qapashuly Altynbayev (Kazakh: Мұхтар Қапашұлы Алтынбаев, Mūhtar Qapaşūly Altynbaev; born December 10, 1945 in Karaganda, Kazakh SSR, Soviet Union) served as the Minister of Defense and General of the Army of Kazakhstan twice, most recently from December 2001 to 10 January 2007. Prime Minister Karim Massimov replaced him with former Prime Minister Daniyal Akhmetov in a political shakeup.

Early life and career 
He was born on 10 December 1945 in the city of Karaganda. His father was the director of the Karaganda Mine #12. He began his labor activity in 1962 as a shaft sinker in Karaganda, having worked until 1969. In 1969 he entered the Armavir Higher Military School of Air Defense Pilots, where he graduated from as a pilot, in the Soviet Air Forces. He later became a commander of a fighter aviation regiment in the city of Perm. In 1982, he became a student of the Zhukov Air and Space Defence Academy, graduating in 1985. After graduating, he was appointed deputy commander of the 24th Air Defense Corps in the city of Mary (in the Turkmen SSR) within the Turkestan Military District. After transforming the corps into the 17th Air Defence Division, he became its commander.

Kazakh military career 
From 1992 to 1993, he was the Commander of the Air Defense Corps and Deputy Minister of Defense. in October 1996, he became the Minister of Defense. On 8 December 2001, he was again appointed to the post of Minister of Defense. Kazakh President Nursultan Nazarbayev had dismissed Altynbayev from his post as Defense Minister in August 1999 along with Nurtay Abikayev, the head of the National Security Committee. According to Radio Free Europe, they were dismissed for "failing to properly investigate" the illegal sale of Mikoyan-Gurevich MiG-21 fighter aircraft to North Korea. In March 2000 he became commander of Kazakhstan's Air Defense Force.

2007 political shakeup and subsequent roles
President Nazarbayev nominated Karim Massimov, who at the time served as Deputy Prime Minister, to succeed Daniyal Akhmetov as Prime Minister on 9 January 2007. Akhmetov resigned on 8 January without explanation. Analysts attributed Akhmetov's political downfall to the President's criticism of his administrative oversight of the economy. The Parliament confirmed the nomination on 10 January. Massimov appointed Akhmetov to Defense Minister, replacing Altynbayev, and appointed Aslan Musin, formerly the Minister of Economy and Budget, as Deputy Prime Minister. That year, he was appointed as the Chairman of the Joint Chiefs of Staff, a position he would serve in until 2010.

Post-military 
From April 2010 to July 2017, he was a Deputy of the Senate of Kazakhstan. His son Muslim Mukhtarovich Altynbaev served as the Deputy Defense Minister to Saken Zhasuzakov and Nurlan Yermekbayev from 2017-2020.

Honours and awards

Kazakhstan 
People's Hero of Kazakhstan
 Order Otan
 Order Barys, 2nd class
 Medal "For Meritorious Service" (Kazakhstan), 3rd class
 Astana Medal
 Medal "10th Anniversary of the Armed Forces of the Republic of Kazakhstan"
 Medal "10 years of independence of the Republic of Kazakhstan"
 Medal "10th Anniversary of the Constitution of the Republic of Kazakhstan"
 Medal "10 Years of the Parliament of the Republic of Kazakhstan"
 Medal "50 years of the Baikonur Cosmodrome"
 Medal "For strengthening military cooperation"
Medal "10 years of Astana"
 Medal "20 years of independence of the Republic of Kazakhstan"

Soviet Union 
Order for Service to the Homeland in the Armed Forces of the USSR, 3rd class
Medal "Veteran of the Armed Forces of the USSR"
Jubilee Medal "60 Years of the Armed Forces of the USSR"
Jubilee Medal "70 Years of the Armed Forces of the USSR"
Medal "For Impeccable Service" 1st, 2nd and 3rd classes

Russian Federation 
 Order of Friendship
 Two medals "For strengthening military cooperation"

Former USSR

Kyrgyzstan 
 Medal "For strengthening military cooperation"
 Medal "10th Anniversary of the Armed Forces of the Kyrgyz Republic"
 Medal "For Distinction in Military Service"

Ukraine 
 Medal "10th Anniversary of the Armed Forces of Ukraine"

Moldova 
 Medal "For strengthening military commonwealth"

Other 
 Order of Peter the Great, 1st class (Academy of Security, Defense and Law Enforcement)
 Honorary Citizen of the City of Karaganda (2005)
 Honorary Citizen of the Karaganda Region (2017)

See also
Government of Kazakhstan

References

1945 births
Living people
People from Karaganda
Government ministers of Kazakhstan
Heroes of Kazakhstan
Ministers of Defence of Kazakhstan
Chiefs of the General Staff (Kazakhstan)
Zhukov Air and Space Defence Academy alumni